Harcharan Singh (15 August 1938 – 8 October 2019) was an Indian cricketer. He played in 50 first-class matches from 1955/56 to 1968/69. He was the leading run-scorer in the 1961–62 Ranji Trophy, with 495 runs in five matches for Southern Punjab.

See also
 List of Services cricketers

References

External links
 

1938 births
2019 deaths
Indian cricketers
Patiala cricketers
Southern Punjab cricketers
Services cricketers
Place of birth missing